The following lists events that happened in 1957 in Iceland.

Incumbents
President – Ásgeir Ásgeirsson
Prime Minister – Hermann Jónasson

Events

Births

3 March – Atli Eðvaldsson, footballer (d. 2019)
22 March – Þorsteinn Bjarnason, footballer
9 April – Oddný Guðbjörg Harðardóttir, politician.
24 June – Lilja Rafney Magnúsdóttir, politician.
30 June – Ólafur Jóhannesson, footballer
15 July – Kristján Þór Júlíusson, politician
15 July – Sigurlás Þorleifsson, footballer (d. 2018)

Full date missing
Ásgeir Helgason, scientist

Deaths

References

 
1950s in Iceland
Iceland
Iceland
Years of the 20th century in Iceland